Franco Matías Russo (born 25 October 1994) is an Argentine professional footballer who plays for Bulgarian First League club Ludogorets Razgrad as a central defender.

Club career
Born in Buenos Aires, Russo finished his formation with All Boys before moving to Spain for a trial with Rayo Vallecano. Despite being told he would earn a contract with the club, he was released after suffering a quadriceps injury.

After living in a room in Madrid and a failed trial at Lleida Esportiu, Russo signed for Tercera División side CDJ Tamarite, and made his senior debut with the club during the 2014–15 campaign. On 25 June 2015, he agreed to a two-year contract with RCD Espanyol, being initially assigned to reserves in Segunda División B.

On 28 January 2017, after featuring rarely, Russo was loaned to FC Vilafranca in the fourth division, until June. He left his parent club as his contract expired on 30 June, and signed for Ontinyent CF in Segunda División B on 5 August.

On 9 July 2018, Russo signed a two-year contract with Segunda División side RCD Mallorca. He made his professional debut on 11 September, starting in a 1–0 home win against Real Oviedo for the season's Copa del Rey.

Russo made his debut in the second division on 29 September 2018, starting in a 1–1 away draw against CD Lugo. He contributed with only four league appearances during the campaign, as his side achieved promotion to La Liga, and was loaned to second division side SD Ponferradina on 12 July 2019.

Upon returning, Russo was again a backup option as Mallorca returned to the top tier. He made his debut in the category on 21 August 2021, starting in a 1–0 away win over Deportivo Alavés.

Russo became a regular starter during the 2021–22 season under manager Luis García, and scored his first goal in the top tier on 4 December 2021, in a 2–1 win at Atlético Madrid.

On 16 January 2023, Russo signed a contract with Bulgarian First League club Ludogorets Razgrad.

References

External links

1994 births
Living people
Footballers from Buenos Aires
Argentine footballers
Association football defenders
La Liga players
Segunda División players
Segunda División B players
Tercera División players
RCD Espanyol B footballers
FC Vilafranca players
Ontinyent CF players
RCD Mallorca players
SD Ponferradina players
PFC Ludogorets Razgrad players
Argentine expatriate footballers
Argentine expatriate sportspeople in Spain
Argentine expatriate sportspeople in Bulgaria
Expatriate footballers in Spain
Expatriate footballers in Bulgaria